Olivier Becht (born 28 April 1976) is a French politician of the Agir party who has been serving as Minister for Foreign Trade, Attractiveness and French Nationals Abroad in the government of Prime Minister Élisabeth Borne since 2022. From the 2017 elections to 2022, he was a member of the National Assembly of France, representing the Haut-Rhin department. He was previously the mayor of the Rixheim commune.

Political career
In parliament, Becht served as member of the Defence Committee. In this capacity, he co-authored (with Stéphane Trompille) a parliamentary report on space defence in 2019, calling on the Ministry of the Armies to upgrade its capabilities given the proliferation of competitors and potential enemies. He was also a member of the French parliamentary friendship groups with Germany, Japan and Romania.

In addition to his committee assignments, Becht was a member of the French delegation to the Parliamentary Assembly of the Council of Europe from 2017 to 2022. In this capacity, he served on the Committee on the Election of Judges to the European Court of Human Rights; the Committee on Culture, Science, Education and Media; and the Sub-Committee on Media and Information Society. In 2020, he was the Assembly's rapporteur on the regulation of neurotechnology, including brain–computer interfaces.

Political positions
In late 2019, Becht was one of 17 members of the committee who co-signed a letter to Prime Minister Édouard Philippe in which they warned that the 365 million euro ($406 million) sale of aerospace firm Groupe Latécoère to U.S. fund Searchlight Capital raised “questions about the preservation of know-how and France’s defence industry base” and urged government intervention.

References

1976 births
Living people
Agir (France) politicians
Deputies of the 15th National Assembly of the French Fifth Republic
Mayors of places in Grand Est
Politicians from Strasbourg
École nationale d'administration alumni
French people of German descent
Deputies of the 16th National Assembly of the French Fifth Republic
Members of the Borne government